Grete Nissl (born 30 November 1911, date of death unknown) was an Austrian alpine skier. She competed in the women's combined event at the 1936 Winter Olympics.

References

External links
 

1911 births
Year of death missing
Austrian female alpine skiers
Olympic alpine skiers of Austria
Alpine skiers at the 1936 Winter Olympics
Sportspeople from Innsbruck